Chasewater Heaths is a heritage railway station on the Chasewater Railway in Burntwood, Staffordshire.  It has station building facilities, including a cafe; and a recently rebuilt signal box.  To the west is Norton Lakeside Halt and to the east is the terminus, Chasetown (Church Street).

The station was constructed in 2000 as part of the extension of the line, that was undertaken following the construction of the M6 Toll Motorway.

References

Heritage railway stations in Staffordshire
Burntwood
Railway stations built for UK heritage railways